Attack is the first studio album by Japanese music group AAA. The album consists of a total 12 singles.

Attack was released on January 1, 2006 in the Avex Trax label in three editions: a CD and DVD edition, a CD-only edition, and a half album edition.

Track listing 

2006 debut albums
AAA (band) albums
Avex Trax albums